Captain Douglas Ford  (18 September 1918 – 18 December 1943) was a British Army officer of the Royal Scots and a British prisoner of war in the Second World War, who was posthumously awarded the George Cross for conspicuous gallantry. His citation was published in the London Gazette on 18 March 1946.

Early life
Ford was born in Galashiels in September 1918. He was a son of Mrs and Mrr Douglas Ford, of 25 Bryce Avenue, Portobello. He was educated at the Royal High School, Edinburgh. A keen sportsman, excelling in rugby and cricket, he rose to school captain in 1936. He was 20, and on part-time studies at the University of Edinburgh for chartered accountancy, when he joined the Royal Scots at the outbreak of war. A member of the University OTC, he was commissioned, and posted to Hong Kong. His brother, James Allan Ford, was also a captain in the Royal Scots. This was the first time that two brothers in the regiment had served together in Hong Kong.

Second World War
Ford was still serving in the 2nd Battalion, Royal Scots, when he and his brother were taken prisoner by the invading Japanese upon the fall of Hong Kong in December 1941. During his captivity at Sham Shui Po POW camp he made contact with British agents and planned, in conjunction with other officers, a major break out. Before the plans could be put into operation the Japanese grew suspicious and interrogated him and others they suspected of involvement. Despite torture in Stanley Prison, starvation and a sentence of death he refused to betray his comrades. After being forced to dig his own grave, he was executed by Japanese firing squad, at Sham Shui on 18 December 1943, with two fellow prisoners, Colonel Lance Newnham, MC, the Middlesex Regiment, and Flight Lieutenant Hector Gray, Royal Air Force. He is buried in Stanley Prison cemetery.

The citation noted:

King George VI approved the award '"in recognition of the most conspicuous gallantry in carrying out hazardous work in a very brave manner".

Captain Ford is buried in Stanley Military Cemetery, Hong Kong, grave reference 1.B.41.

His brother, James Allan Ford, survived the war and later wrote a novel based on the life and death of Douglas Ford, Season of Escape, which was awarded the Frederick Niven Award.

References

1918 births
1943 deaths
Scottish military personnel
People educated at the Royal High School, Edinburgh
Alumni of the University of Edinburgh
Royal Scots officers
British recipients of the George Cross
World War II prisoners of war held by Japan
British Army personnel killed in World War II
People from Galashiels
Scottish torture victims
British people executed abroad
Executed Scottish people
20th-century executions by Japan
People executed by Japan by firing squad
British World War II prisoners of war
Burials at Stanley Military Cemetery